The Bonita Springs School (also known as the Bonita Springs Elementary School) is a historic school in Bonita Springs, Florida. It is located at 10701 Dean Street. On July 8, 1999, it was added to the U.S. National Register of Historic Places.

This property is part of the Lee County Multiple Property Submission, a Multiple Property Submission to the National Register.

References

External links

 Bonita Springs Elementary School - official site
 Lee County listings at National Register of Historic Places
 Florida's Office of Cultural and Historical Programs
 Lee County listings
 Bonita Springs Elementary School

Public elementary schools in Florida
National Register of Historic Places in Lee County, Florida
Schools in Lee County, Florida
Bonita Springs, Florida